Basford may refer to:

People
 Basford (surname)

Places

United Kingdom
 Basford, Cheshire
 Basford, Nottingham
 Basford Rural District, a rural district close to Nottingham, England, from 1894 to 1974
 Old Basford, an area of Nottingham
 Basford North railway station, a railway station to serve Basford and Bulwell in Nottinghamshire
 New Basford railway station, a station in Nottingham on the Great Central Railway main line
 St. Leodegarius Church, Basford, a parish church in the Church of England
 St. Aidan's Church, Basford, a parish church in the Church of England in Basford, Nottingham
 Basford and Bulwell railway station, a station in Nottingham
 Basford, Shropshire
 Basford, Staffordshire
 Hartshill and Basford Halt railway station, a railway station located between Stoke-on-Trent and Newcastle-under-Lyme

United States
 Basford, Nebraska, a ghost town in the United States